Red Level is an unincorporated community in Citrus County, Florida, United States. The ZIP Codes are 34428, which it shares with Crystal River to the southeast, and 34449, which it shares with Inglis to the north in Levy County.

References

External links
Red Level, Florida (Florida Hometown Locator)

Unincorporated communities in Citrus County, Florida
Unincorporated communities in Florida